Microcancilla microscopica is a species of sea snail, a marine gastropod mollusk in the family Cancellariidae, the nutmeg snails.

Description

References

 Petit R.E., Campbell L.D. & Campbell S.C. (2010). A new species of Zeadmete (Gastropoda: Cancellariidae) from South Carolina, a genus previously unknown in the Atlantic Ocean. The Nautilus 124(1):41–43

External links

Cancellariidae
Gastropods described in 1889